Key Largo is an island in the Florida Keys in the United States.

Key Largo may also refer to:

 Key Largo, Florida, the unincorporated town on the island
 Key Largo (bar), a bar and national historic site in San José, Costa Rica
 Key Largo (board game), a 2005 board game set in Key Largo, Florida
 Key Largo (hotel and casino), a demolished hotel and casino in Las Vegas, Nevada
 Key Largo (play), a 1939 Broadway play by Maxwell Anderson set in Key Largo, Florida
 Key Largo (film), a 1948 film adaptation starring Humphrey Bogart and Lauren Bacall
 "Key Largo" (song), a 1981 song by Bertie Higgins referencing the 1948 film
 "Key Largo" (1948 song), a 1948 song first recorded by Benny Carter
 "Schnapps Key Largo Tropical", a brand of tropical schnapps made by DeKuyper

See also
 Cayo Largo del Sur or "Cay Largo", a small resort island in Cuba